Bilodeau can refer to a number of people:
Alexandre Bilodeau, skier
Brent Bilodeau, ice hockey player
Robin Bilodeau, pastry chef
Gilles Bilodeau, ice hockey player
J. A. Bilodeau, politician
Jean-Luc Bilodeau, actor
Joseph Bilodeau, politician
Régent Bilodeau, International Artiste painter
Yvon Bilodeau, ice hockey player
Vincent Bilodeau, comedian and actor

See also 
Cass Bauer-Bilodeau, basketball player
Jacynthe Millette-Bilodeau, pop singer